Check In is the sole album by the Chalets, released in 2005.

Track listing
"Theme from Chalets" – 2:55
"No Style" – 3:30
"Red High Heels" – 3:12
"Gogo Don't Go" – 3:27
"Arrivals" – 0:41
"Feel the Machine" – 3:13
"Two Chord Song" – 1:55
"Fight Your Kids" – 3:27
"Nightrocker" – 3:18
"Sexy Mistake" – 2:55
"Departures" – 0:42
"Checkout" – 2:41
"Love Punch" – 2:20
"Beach Blanket" – 4:59

References

2005 debut albums
The Chalets albums